Dizaj or Dezej, also rendered as Dizeh or Dizach, may refer to:

Dezej, a city in Kurdistan Province, Iran

Ardabil Province
Dizaj, Ardabil
Dizeh, Khalkhal, Ardabil Province

East Azerbaijan Province
Dizaj, Meyaneh, East Azerbaijan Province
Dizaj, Osku, East Azerbaijan Province
Dizaj-e Aqa Hasan, East Azerbaijan Province
Dizaj Azim, East Azerbaijan Province
Dizaj-e Hasan Beyg, East Azerbaijan Province
Dizaj-e Hoseyn Beyg, East Azerbaijan Province
Dizaj-e Jalu, East Azerbaijan Province
Dizaj Khalil, East Azerbaijan Province
Dizaj-e Leyli Khani, East Azerbaijan Province
Dizaj-e Malek, East Azerbaijan Province
Dizaj-e Mir Homay, East Azerbaijan Province
Dizaj-e Parvaneh, East Azerbaijan Province
Dizaj-e Qorban, East Azerbaijan Province
Dizaj-e Reza Qoli Beyg, East Azerbaijan Province
Dizaj-e Safar Ali, East Azerbaijan Province
Dizaj-e Sefid, East Azerbaijan Province
Dizaj-e Shur, East Azerbaijan Province
Dizaj-e Talkhaj, East Azerbaijan Province

Hamadan Province
Dizaj, Hamadan

Isfahan Province
Dezej, Isfahan, in Dehaqan County

Markazi Province
Dizaj, Markazi

Qazvin Province
Dizaj, Qazvin

Semnan Province
Dizaj, Semnan

West Azerbaijan Province
Dizaj, Chaldoran, a village in Chaldoran County
Dizaj-e Hatam Khan, a village in Chaypareh County
Dizaj-e Aland, a village in Khoy County
Dizaj-e Batchi, a village in Khoy County
Dizaj Diz, a village in Khoy County
Dizaj-e Herik, a village in Khoy County
Dizaj-e Jamshid Khan, a village in Khoy County
Dizaj-e Morteza Kandi, a village in Khoy County
Dizaj, Naqadeh, a village in Naqadeh County
Dizaj, Showt, a village in Showt County
Dizaj, West Azerbaijan, a village in Urmia County
Dizaj-e Dowl, a village in Urmia County
Dizaj-e Naqaleh, a village in Urmia County
Dizaj-e Fathi, a village in Urmia County
Dizaj-e Rahim Pur, a village in Urmia County
Dizaj-e Takyeh, a village in Urmia County
Dizaj Rural District, in Khoy County